A point of contact (POC) or single point of contact (SPOC) is a person or a department serving as the coordinator or focal point of information concerning an activity or program. A POC is used in many cases where information is time-sensitive and accuracy is important. For examples, they are used in WHOIS databases.

See also
Help desk
Touchpoint
Liaison officer
Caret

References

Human communication